Calyculogygas is a genus of flowering plants belonging to the family Malvaceae.

Its native range is Uruguay.

Species:

Calyculogygas serrana 
Calyculogygas uruguayensis

References

Malvaceae
Malvaceae genera